Sorbus groenlandica, the Greenland mountain-ash, is a species of Sorbus found in Greenland and northeastern North America. A shrub, it cannot be found north of 62°15′N, which confines it the southern tip of Greenland, generally deeper up the western fjords, such as the Qinngua Valley. It can also be found in eastern Canada and the US states of New Hampshire and Maine, but is very rare throughout its range. Some authorities have it as a synonym of Sorbus decora, the showy mountain-ash.

References

groenlandica
Flora of Greenland
Flora of Eastern Canada
Flora of the Northeastern United States